The Military ranks of Thailand are the military insignia used by the Royal Thai Armed Forces. The officer ranks are influenced by the ranks of the United States, while the other ranks are influenced by those of France.

Royal Thai Army

Officers

Other ranks

Private 1st class is a rank assigned to conscripts after they have finished specialist training. They wear the same insignia as a lance corporal, who is a member who has completed his conscription obligation, and who has undertaken training at NCO school.

The rank of "Special Sergeant Major 1st Class" is an honorary rank given to senior enlisted members who are deserving of recognition above and beyond that of the highest enlisted rank. There is no difference in the rank insignia worn, and they do not outrank the normal master sergeant 1st class, although in a group situation they will normally be assigned control. They receive a higher salary. In the same way, the RTN has the rating of "fleet chief petty officer (special rank)" and the RTAF has the rank of "special flight sergeant 1st class".

Royal Thai Navy
The Royal Thai Navy is the sea-based part of the Thai military. The Royal Thai Marine Corps is part of the RTN, and uses the same rank structure. Depending on the uniform, the rank insignia can be located on the shoulder (on white and khaki uniforms) or on the sleeves (on dark blue uniforms).

Officers

Naval officers will additionally add the post-nominal ร.น. as an abbreviation for ราชนาวี (râat-chá-naa-wee, literally "the Royal Navy").

Other ranks

The rank of "Fleet chief petty officer" is an honorary rank given to senior enlisted members who are deserving of recognition above and beyond that of the highest enlisted rank. There is no difference in the rank insignia worn, and they do not outrank the normal master sergeant 1st class, although in a group situation they will normally be assigned control. They receive a higher salary.

Royal Thai Air Force
The Royal Thai Air Force (RTAF) (กองทัพอากาศไทย, RTGS Kong Thap Akat Thai) is the air based part of the Thai military. The rank system is modelled after that of the British Royal Air Force (RAF), but unlike the RAF, officers' cuff rank insignia are topped by a star above the lace stripes and all air marshals' rank insignia are also determined by one to five stars on the shoulder board.

Officers

Other ranks

The rank of "Special flight sergeant 1st class" is an honorary rank given to senior enlisted members who are deserving of recognition above and beyond that of the highest enlisted rank. There is no difference in the rank insignia worn, and they do not outrank the normal master sergeant 1st class, although in a group situation they will normally be assigned control. They receive a higher salary.

Royal Thai Police 
The Royal Thai Police (RTP) is sometimes considered as the fourth armed service of Thailand (๔ เหล่าทัพ), but reports directly to the Prime Minister's Department rather than to the Ministry of Defense. The Royal Thai Police share the same rank system as the Royal Thai Army but the particularities of the police are the star representing the commissioned officer and the crown over the star. The Royal Thai Police uses the eight-pointed silver star and the silver crown with a halo on top, while the Royal Thai Army uses the five-pointed gold star and the gold crown with no halo for its officer shoulder boards.

Officers

Non-Commissioned Officers

Volunteer Defense Corps (Thailand) 
The Volunteer Defense Corps (abbreviated VDC) is a Thai paramilitary under the authority of the Department Of Provincial Administration, Ministry of Interior. It was founded in 1954 to provide extra military support to the Royal Thai Armed Forces and to protect local civilians living near Thailand's borders. Its ranks mirror those of both the RTA and the RTP.

Officers

Enlisted

Rank structure 
 (Also used as Chom Thap (จอมทัพ)) is Head of Forces, there can only be one Chom Thap at a time, the King is the Chom Thap. ( .) Ranks below commander-in-chief use Thai alternate numbers.

See also 
 Thai noble titles

References

External links

  Royal Thai Army (Official website - Thai version)
  Royal Thai Air force (Official website - English version)
  Royal Thai Navy (Official website - English version)
 Thai Ministry of Defence (Official website - English version)
 Royal Thai Police (Official website)

 
Thailand